In the human embryo, the vitelline duct, also known as the vitellointestinal duct, the yolk stalk, the omphaloenteric duct, or the omphalomesenteric duct, is a long narrow tube that joins the yolk sac to the midgut lumen of the developing fetus. It appears at the end of the fourth week, when the yolk sac presents the appearance of a small pear-shaped vesicle (the umbilical vesicle).

Function

Obliteration
Generally, the duct fully obliterates (narrows and disappears) during the 5–6th week of fertilization age (9th week of gestational age), but a failure of the duct to close is termed a vitelline fistula. This results in discharge of meconium from the umbilicus. About two percent of fetuses exhibit a type of vitelline fistula characterized by persistence of the proximal part of the vitelline duct as a diverticulum protruding from the small intestine, Meckel's diverticulum, which is typically situated within two feet of the ileocecal junction and may be attached by a fibrous cord to the abdominal wall at the umbilicus.

Persistence
The vesicle can be seen in the afterbirth as a small, somewhat oval-shaped body, the diameter of which varies from 1 mm to 5 mm. It is situated between the amnion and the chorion and may lie on or at a varying distance from the placenta.

Clinical significance

Meckel's diverticulum

Sometimes a narrowing of the lumen of the ileum is seen opposite the site of attachment of the duct. On this site of attachment, sometimes a pathological Meckel's diverticulum may be present.

A mnemonic used to recall details of a Meckel's diverticulum is as follows: "2 inches long, within 2 feet of ileocecal valve, 2 times as common in males than females, 2% of population, 2% symptomatic, 2 types of ectopic tissue: gastric and pancreatic". In the decades since the mnemonic was developed, further epidemiology has found the incidence of symptomatic diverticulae to be 4%, not 2%, and the incidence to be 2–5x greater in males than females, but the mnemonic is still helpful.

Additional images

References

Further reading

Embryology
Medical mnemonics